Foltyn is a surname. Notable people with the surname include:

Hanna Foltyn-Kubicka (born 1950), Polish politician and a Member of the European Parliament
Łukasz Foltyn (born 1974), Polish programmer
Michael Foltýn (born  1994), Czech ice hockey player
Martin Foltýn (born 1993), Czech football player 
Stanisław Fołtyn (1936–2003), Polish footballer

References